West Mains is an area of the Scottish new town East Kilbride, in South Lanarkshire.

West Mains is a residential area in the northwest of the town, bordering College Milton and East Mains. East Kilbride railway station falls under the district.

There are two primary schools in the area - Kirktonholme and St Kenneth's Primary Schools. These were both rebuilt in 2009/2010 as part of the South Lanarkshire Schools modernisation programme.

External links
 West Mains Community Council

Areas of East Kilbride